Czesław Czypicki (1855-1926) was a Polish lawyer from Kożmin, activist for the singers societies. His father was a forester. After graduating from a Junior High School in Braniewo, he studied law in Wroclaw. He did his internship in a court in Jastrowie (Western Pomerania), and then settled in Koźmin Wielkopolski.

In 1895, he co-founded the Association of Industrial Societies in Poznań. He also co-founded the Bank Parcelacyjny in Poznań.

References
 Witold Jakóbczyk, Przetrwać na Wartą 1815-1914, Dzieje narodu i państwa polskiego, vol. III-55, Krajowa Agencja Wydawnicza, Warszawa 1989
 Czesław Czypicki, w: Wielkopolski słownik biograficzny, Warszawa-Poznań 1981, PWN 

19th-century Polish lawyers
People from the Province of Posen
1855 births
1926 deaths
20th-century Polish lawyers